The 2015 Missouri Valley Conference baseball tournament was held from May 19 through 23, 2015.  All eight baseball-sponsoring schools in the conference participated in the double-elimination tournament at Wichita State's Eck Stadium in Wichita, Kansas.  Missouri State, the winner of the tournament, won the conference's automatic bid to the 2015 NCAA Division I baseball tournament.

Seeding and format
The league's eight teams were seeded based on conference winning percentage.  The teams played a two bracket, double-elimination format tournament, with the winner of each bracket then playing a single elimination final.

Results

References

Tournament
Missouri Valley Conference Baseball Tournament
Missouri Valley Conference baseball tournament
Missouri Valley Conference baseball tournament